The men's combined was held on Tuesday, 14 February, two days after the downhill. The combined competition, as the name suggests, is a combination where the times in the downhill racing and the slalom events are added. One run of downhill and two runs of slalom are used to determine overall ranking in the combined event. All three runs were held in a single day.

Norway's Kjetil André Aamodt was defending Olympic champion from Salt Lake City in 2002, while Benjamin Raich of Austria was the reigning world champion. Raich led the Combined standings on the World Cup entering the Olympics, followed by Michael Walchhofer (Austria) and Bode Miller (USA) in a tie for second.

Miller, the leader after the downhill portion, was disqualified in the first slalom run for straddling a gate. This left Raich in the lead going into the final run of slalom, followed by Ivica Kostelić and young American Ted Ligety. Ligety scorched the final run for the gold medal, while Raich skied out. Aamodt did not start the event after a knee injury, and Filip Trejbal had to withdraw after a spectacular crash which delayed the event for a prolonged period.

These were the last Olympics to use the traditional combined format (one downhill run and two slalom runs). Starting in 2010, the Olympics are scheduled to switch to the "super-combined" format (one run each of downhill & slalom) for the combined event.  First run on the World Cup circuit in 2005 at Wengen, the "super-combi" format was first used at the world championships in 2007.

Results
The results of the men's combined event in Alpine skiing at the 2006 Winter Olympics.

References

External links
Official Olympic Report

Combined